Toolse River is a river in Lääne-Viru County, Estonia. The river is 25.2 km long and basin size is 84.3 km2. It runs into Gulf of Finland.

Trouts and Thymallus thymallus live also in the river.

References

Rivers of Estonia
Lääne-Viru County